In the physics of electromagnetism, the Abraham–Lorentz force  (also known as the Lorentz–Abraham force) is the recoil force on an accelerating charged particle caused by the particle emitting electromagnetic radiation by self-interaction. It is also called the radiation reaction force, the radiation damping force,  or the self-force. It is named after the physicists Max Abraham and Hendrik Lorentz.

The formula although predating the theory of special relativity, was initially calculated for non-relativistic velocity approximations was extended to arbitrary velocities by Max Abraham and was shown to be physically consistent by George Adolphus Schott. The non-relativistic form is called Lorentz self-force while the relativistic version is called the Lorentz–Dirac force or the Abraham–Lorentz–Dirac force. The equations are in the domain of classical physics, not quantum physics, and therefore may not be valid at distances of roughly the Compton wavelength or below. There are, however, two analogs of the formula that are both fully quantum and relativistic: one is called the "Abraham–Lorentz–Dirac–Langevin equation", the other is the self-force on a moving mirror. 

The force is proportional to the square of the object's charge, multiplied by the jerk (rate of change of acceleration) that it is experiencing. The force points in the direction of the jerk. For example, in a cyclotron, where the jerk points opposite to the velocity, the radiation reaction is directed opposite to the velocity of the particle, providing a braking action.  The Abraham–Lorentz force is the source of the radiation resistance of a radio antenna radiating radio waves.

There are pathological solutions of the Abraham–Lorentz–Dirac equation in which a particle accelerates in advance of the application of a force, so-called pre-acceleration solutions.  Since this would represent an effect occurring before its cause (retrocausality), some theories have speculated that the equation allows signals to travel backward in time, thus challenging the physical principle of causality.  One resolution of this problem was discussed by Arthur D. Yaghjian and was further discussed by Fritz Rohrlich and Rodrigo Medina.

Definition and description 
Mathematically, the Lorentz-self force derived for non-relativistic velocity approximation , is given in SI units by:

or in Gaussian units by

where  is the force,  is the derivative of acceleration, or the third derivative of displacement, also called jerk,  μ0 is the magnetic constant, ε0 is the electric constant, c is the speed of light in free space, and q is the electric charge of the particle.

Physically, an accelerating charge emits radiation (according to the Larmor formula), which carries momentum away from the charge. Since momentum is conserved, the charge is pushed in the direction opposite the direction of the emitted radiation. In fact the formula above for radiation force can be derived from the Larmor formula, as shown below.

The Abraham-Lorentz force, a generalization of Lorentz self-force for arbitrary velocities is given by:

Where γ is the Lorentz factor associated with v, velocity of particle. The formula is consistent with special relativity and reduces to Lorentz's self-force expression for low velocity limit.

The covariant form of radiation reaction deduced by Dirac for arbitrary shape of elementary charges is found to be:

History 
First calculation of the radiation electromagnetic energy due to current was given by George Francis FitzGerald in 1883, where radiation resistance appears. However, dipole antenna experiments by Heinrich Hertz made bigger impact and gathered commentary by Poincaré on the amortissement or damping of the oscillator due to emission of radiation. Qualitative discussions surrounding damping effects of radiation emitted by accelerating charge was sparked by Henry Poincaré in 1891. In 1892, Hendrik Lorentz derived self interaction force for low velocities on charges but did not correlate it with radiation losses. Suggestion of correlation of radiation energy loss to self force was first made by Max Planck. Plank's concept surrounding the damping force which did not assume any special shape of elementary charged particles was applied by Max Abraham to find the radiation resistance of an antenna in 1898 which remains to be the most practical application of the phenomenon.

In early 1900s, Abraham formulated a generalization of Lorentz self-force to arbitrary velocities whose physical consistency was later shown by Schott. Schott was able to derive Abraham equation and attributed "acceleration energy" to be the source of energy of the electromagnetic radiation. Originally submitted as an essay for 1908 Adams Prize, he won the competition and had the essay published as a book in 1912. The relation between self-force and radiation reaction became well established at this point. Wolfgang Pauli first obtained covariant form of the radiation reaction and in 1938, Paul Dirac found that equation of motion of charge particles, without assuming the shape of the particle, contained Abraham's formula within reasonable approximations. The equations hence derived by Dirac are considered exact within the limits of classical theory.

Background

In classical electrodynamics, problems are typically divided into two classes:

 Problems in which the charge and current sources of fields are specified and the fields are calculated, and
 The reverse situation, problems in which the fields are specified and the motion of particles are calculated.

In some fields of physics, such as plasma physics and the calculation of transport coefficients (conductivity, diffusivity, etc.), the fields generated by the sources and the motion of the sources are solved self-consistently. In such cases, however, the motion of a selected source is calculated in response to fields generated by all other sources. Rarely is the motion of a particle (source) due to the fields generated by that same particle calculated. The reason for this is twofold:

 Neglect of the "self-fields" usually leads to answers that are accurate enough for many applications, and
 Inclusion of self-fields leads to problems in physics such as renormalization, some of which are still unsolved, that relate to the very nature of matter and energy.

These conceptual problems created by self-fields are highlighted in a standard graduate text. [Jackson]

 The difficulties presented by this problem touch one of the most fundamental aspects of physics, the nature of the elementary particle. Although partial solutions, workable within limited areas, can be given, the basic problem remains unsolved. One might hope that the transition from classical to quantum-mechanical treatments would remove the difficulties. While there is still hope that this may eventually occur, the present quantum-mechanical discussions are beset with even more elaborate troubles than the classical ones. It is one of the triumphs of comparatively recent years (~ 1948–1950) that the concepts of Lorentz covariance and gauge invariance were exploited sufficiently cleverly to circumvent these difficulties in quantum electrodynamics and so allow the calculation of very small radiative effects to extremely high precision, in full agreement with experiment. From a fundamental point of view, however, the difficulties remain. 

The Abraham–Lorentz force is the result of the most fundamental calculation of the effect of self-generated fields. It arises from the observation that accelerating charges emit radiation. The Abraham–Lorentz force is the average force that an accelerating charged particle feels in the recoil from the emission of radiation. The introduction of quantum effects leads one to quantum electrodynamics. The self-fields in quantum electrodynamics generate a finite number of infinities in the calculations that can be removed by the process of renormalization. This has led to a theory that is able to make the most accurate predictions that humans have made to date. (See precision tests of QED.)  The renormalization process fails, however, when applied to the gravitational force. The infinities in that case are infinite in number, which causes the failure of renormalization. Therefore, general relativity has an unsolved self-field problem. String theory and loop quantum gravity are current attempts to resolve this problem, formally called the problem of radiation reaction or the problem of self-force.

Derivation 
The simplest derivation for the self-force is found for periodic motion from the Larmor formula for the power radiated from a point charge that moves with velocity much lower than that of speed of light:

The above expression can be integrated by parts. If we assume that there is periodic motion, the boundary term in the integral by parts disappears:

Clearly, we can identify the Lorentz self-force equation which is applicable to slow moving particles as:

A more rigorous derivation, which does not require periodic motion, was found using an effective field theory formulation.

A generalized equation for arbitrary velocities was formulated by Max Abraham, which is found to be consistent with special relativity. An alternative derivation, making use of theory of relativity which was well established at that time, was found by Dirac without any assumption of the shape of the charged particle.

Signals from the future 

Below is an illustration of how a classical analysis can lead to surprising results. The classical theory can be seen to challenge standard pictures of causality, thus signaling either a breakdown or a need for extension of the theory. In this case the extension is to quantum mechanics and its relativistic counterpart quantum field theory. See the quote from Rohrlich  in the introduction concerning "the importance of obeying the validity limits of a physical theory".

For a particle in an external force , we have

where

This equation can be integrated once to obtain

The integral extends from the present to infinitely far in the future. Thus future values of the force affect the acceleration of the particle in the present. The future values are weighted by the factor

Therefore, signals from an interval approximately   into the future affect the acceleration in the present. For an electron, this time is approximately  sec, which is the time it takes for a light wave to travel across the "size" of an electron, the classical electron radius. In other words, it forms the length (or time, or energy) scale where something as light as an electron would be fully relativistic. It is worth noting that this expression does not involve the Planck constant at all, so although it indicates something is wrong at this length scale, it does not directly relate to quantum uncertainty, or to the frequency–energy relation of a photon. Although it is common in quantum mechanics to treat  as a "classical limit", some speculate that even the classical theory needs renormalization, no matter how the Planck constant would be fixed.

Abraham–Lorentz–Dirac force

To find the relativistic generalization, Dirac renormalized the mass in the equation of motion with the Abraham–Lorentz force in 1938. This renormalized equation of motion is called the Abraham–Lorentz–Dirac equation of motion.

Definition
The expression derived by Dirac is given in signature (−, +, +, +) by 

With Liénard's relativistic generalization of Larmor's formula in the co-moving frame,

one can show this to be a valid force by manipulating the time average equation for power:

Paradoxes

Pre-acceleration 
Similar to the non-relativistic case, there are pathological solutions using the Abraham–Lorentz–Dirac equation that anticipate a change in the external force and according to which the particle accelerates in advance of the application of a force, so-called preacceleration solutions. One resolution of this problem was discussed by Yaghjian, and is further discussed by Rohrlich and Medina.

Runaway solutions 
Runaway solutions are solutions to ALD equations that suggest the force on objects will increase exponential over time. It is considered as an unphysical solution.

Hyperbolic motion 

The ALD equations are known to be zero for constant acceleration or hyperbolic motion in Minkowski space-time diagram. The subject of whether in such condition electromagnetic radiation exists was matter of debate until Fritz Rohrlich resolved the problem by showing that hyperbolically moving charges do emit radiation. Subsequently the issue is discussed in context of energy conservation and equivalence principle which is classically resolved by considering "acceleration energy" or Schott energy.

Self-interactions 
However the antidamping mechanism resulting from the Abraham–Lorentz force can be compensated by other nonlinear terms, which are frequently disregarded in the expansions of the retarded Liénard–Wiechert potential.

Experimental observations
While the Abraham–Lorentz force is largely neglected for many experimental considerations, it gains importance for plasmonic excitations in larger nanoparticles due to large local field enhancements. Radiation damping acts as a limiting factor for the plasmonic excitations in surface-enhanced Raman scattering. The damping force was shown to broaden surface plasmon resonances in gold nanoparticles, nanorods and clusters. 

The effects of radiation damping on nuclear magnetic resonance were also observed by Nicolaas Bloembergen and Robert Pound, who reported its dominance over spin–spin and spin–lattice relaxation mechanisms for certain cases.

The Abraham–Lorentz force has been observed in the semiclassical regime in experiments which involve the scattering of a relativistic beam of electrons with a high intensity laser. In the experiments, a supersonic jet of helium gas is intercepted by a high-intensity (1018–1020 W/cm2) laser. The laser ionizes the helium gas and accelerates the electrons via what is known as the “laser-wakefield” effect. A second high-intensity laser beam is then propagated counter to this accelerated electron beam. In a small number of cases, inverse-Compton scattering occurs between the photons and the electron beam, and the spectra of the scattered electrons and photons are measured. The photon spectra are then compared with spectra calculated from Monte Carlo simulations that use either the QED or classical LL equations of motion.

See also
Lorentz force
Cyclotron radiation
Synchrotron radiation
Electromagnetic mass
Radiation resistance
Radiation damping
Wheeler–Feynman absorber theory
Magnetic radiation reaction force

References

Further reading 
  See sections 11.2.2 and 11.2.3
 
 Donald H. Menzel (1960) Fundamental Formulas of Physics, Dover Publications Inc., vol. 1, page 345.
 Stephen Parrott (1987) Relativistic Electrodynamics and Differential Geometry, § 4.3 Radiation reaction and the Lorentz–Dirac equation, pages 136–45, and § 5.5 Peculiar solutions of the Lorentz–Dirac equation, pages 195–204, Springer-Verlag  .

External links
 MathPages – Does A Uniformly Accelerating Charge Radiate?
 Feynman: The Development of the Space-Time View of Quantum Electrodynamics
 EC. del Río: Radiation of an accelerated charge

Electrodynamics
Electromagnetic radiation
Radiation
Hendrik Lorentz